During World War II, the Belgian government needed to mint coins using metal that would not be needed for the war effort. Therefore, silver coinage was discontinued and coins were instead minted using pure zinc.

In 1944, shortly before the Liberation, the Allies minted 25 million 2 franc coins at the Philadelphia Mint, which were put in circulation after Belgium regained its independence.

Occupation coinage

One Franc

The 1 Franc coin was circulated through Belgium from 1941.

Belgique-Belgie lettering

Belgie-Belgique lettering

Five Francs

The 5 franc coin was minted between 1941 and 1947, first by the Germans during the occupation of Belgium, and then by the Belgian government after the end of World War II. The coin composed of 100% zinc, and was an emergency issue type.

Five Centimes
The 5 centimes coin was minted between 1941 and 1943 during the German occupation. The coin composed of 100% zinc, and was an emergency issue type. There are also two varieties. The Centime is a sub-unit of the franc.  It is 1/100 of a franc.

Belgique-Belgie lettering

Belgie-Belgique lettering

Ten Centimes

The 10 centimes coin was minted between 1941 and 1946, first by the Germans during the occupation of Belgium, and then by the Belgian government after World War II ended. The coin composed of 100% zinc, and was an emergency issue type. There are also two different varieties.

Belgique-Belgie lettering

Belgie-Belgique lettering

Twenty-five Centimes

The 25 centimes coin was minted between 1941 and 1947, first by the Germans during the occupation, and then by the Belgian government after World War II ended. The coin composed of 100% zinc, and was an emergency issue type. There are also two different varieties.

Belgique-Belgie lettering

Belgie-Belgique lettering

Liberation coinage

Two Francs

The 2 franc coin was minted by the United States in 1944 in preparation for the Allied liberation of Belgium. An Allied Occupation Issue, this coin was minted at the Philadelphia Mint with the blank planchets of the 1943 steel cent  Some of these coins have a slightly different weight, and thus their blank planchets would have been specifically made for this foreign denomination.

References